Uncinaria is a genus of nematode. The genus was circumscribed by Josef Aloys Frölich in 1789.

Species include:
 Uncinaria criniformis 
 Uncinaria lucasi 
 Uncinaria sanguinis 
 Uncinaria stenocephala 
 Uncinaria yukonensis

References

Further reading

 
 

Strongylida
Rhabditida genera